This article lists the national futsal squads for the 2016 FIFA Futsal World Cup tournament held in Colombia, between 10 September to 1 October 2016.

Group A

Head coach:  Arney Fonnegra

Head coach:  Jorge Braz

Head coach:  Pulpis

Head coach:  Agustín Campuzano

Group B

Head coach:  Miguel Conde

Head coach:  Sergey Skorovich

Head coach:  Clemente Reinoso

Head coach:  Hesham Saleh

Group C

Head coach:  Carlos Chilavert

Head coach:  Roberto Menichelli

Head coach:  Bruno García Formoso

Head coach:  Tomás De Dios

Group D

Head coach:  Oleksandr Kosenko

Head coach:  Sérgio

Head coach:  Naymo Abdul

Head coach:  Robert Varela

Group E

Head coach:  Diego Giustozzi

Head coach:  Ricardo Sobral

Head coach:  Juliano Schmeling

Head coach:  Diego Solís

Group F

Head coach:  Mohammad Nazemalsharieh

Head coach:  Venancio López

Head coach:  Hicham Dguig

Head coach:  Miltinho

References

External links
 Official website

S
FIFA Futsal World Cup squads